Miss Teen USA 1994, the 12th Miss Teen USA pageant, was televised live from the Mississippi Gulf Coast Coliseum in Biloxi, Mississippi on August 16, 1994.  At the conclusion of the final competition, Shauna Gambill of California was crowned by outgoing queen Charlotte Lopez of Vermont.

The pageant was hosted by Bob Goen for the first of three years, with color commentary by Daisy Fuentes and Jamie Solinger, Miss Teen USA 1992.  Music was provided by the Gulf Coast Teen Orchestra.

This was the fifth and final year that the pageant was held in Biloxi.

Results

Placements

Special awards
Miss Congeniality: Mary Elizabeth Stevenson (South Carolina)
Miss Photogenic: Anjelie Eldredge (Washington)
Best in Swimsuit: Shauna Gambill (California)
Minolta Photo Contest: Denise Fisher (Maryland)

Scores

 Winner 
 First runner-up
 Second runner-up 
 Finalists

Preliminary competition
The following are the contestants' scores in the preliminary competition.

 Winner
 First runner-up
 Second runner-up 
 Top 6 Finalist 
 Top 12 Semi-finalist

Historical significance 
 California wins competition for the first time. Also becoming in the 11th state who wins Miss Teen USA.
 Georgia earns the 1st runner-up position for the second time. This was last placed in 1991.
 Kansas earns the 2nd runner-up position for the second time. This was last placed in 1992.
 Missouri finishes as Top 6  for the first time.
 South Carolina finishes as Top 6  for the first time.
 Tennessee finishes as Top 6 for the first time.
 States that placed in semi-finals the previous year were Georgia, Indiana, Pennsylvania, South Carolina and Tennessee.
 Indiana placed for the fourth consecutive year.
 Georgia, Pennsylvania, South Carolina and Tennessee made their second consecutive placement.
 California, Kansas and Mississippi last placed in 1992.
 Louisiana and Missouri last placed in 1991.
 New Jersey last placed in 1988.
 Florida last placed in 1986.

Delegates
The Miss Teen USA 1994 delegates were:

 Alabama – Melanie McLin
 Alaska – Kristina Bellamy
 Arizona – Mistie Kline Nykole
 Arkansas – Rebecca Hall
 California – Shauna Gambill
 Colorado – Angie Payne
 Connecticut – Stacey Raffone
 Delaware – Celina Delgrossa
 District of Columbia – Tamara McDowell
 Florida – Christy Fatzinger
 Georgia – Whitney Fuller
 Hawaii – Emily Huff
 Idaho – Sarah Elizabeth Polk
 Illinois – Charlotte Martin
 Indiana – Nicolette Van Hook
 Iowa – Erika Miller
 Kansas – Melissa Hurtig
 Kentucky – Crystal Beth Hayden
 Louisiana – Sarah Miriam Louther
 Maine – Jennifer Hunt
 Maryland – Denise Fisher
 Massachusetts – Michelle Neves
 Michigan – Melissa Jackson
 Minnesota – Paige Swenson
 Mississippi – Angie Carpenter
 Missouri – Tiffany Meyer
 Montana – Desiree Gravelle
 Nebraska – Elizabeth Schmidt
 Nevada – Heather Kittrel
 New Hampshire – Keri Lynn Pratt
 New Jersey – Kelli Lynn Paarz
 New Mexico – Samantha Sengle
 New York –  Kimberly Pressler
 North Carolina – Valarie Beasley
 North Dakota – Allison Nesemeier
 Ohio – Rebecca Reed
 Oklahoma – Summer Riley
 Oregon – Jodi Ann Paterson
 Pennsylvania – Nicole Bigham
 Rhode Island – Nicole Coletti
 South Carolina – Mary Elizabeth Stevenson
 South Dakota – Autumn McKinney
 Tennessee – Allison Alderson
 Texas – Jacqueline Pena
 Utah – Heather Henderson
 Vermont – Christel Marquardt
 Virginia – Christin Wilson
 Washington – Anjelie Eldredge
 West Virginia – Jonelle Spiker
 Wisconsin – Tara Llewelowitz
 Wyoming – Whitney Ahlstrom

Judges
Marco St. John
Donna Richardson
Dean Kelly
Kate Linder
John Frazier
Angela J. Harrington
Cobi Jones
Brandi Sherwood
Sean Kanan

Contestant notes
Allison Alderson (Tennessee) later won the Miss Tennessee 1999 and Miss Tennessee USA 2002 titles, becoming only one of seven Triple Crown winners.  She went on to marry Jay DeMarcus of the band Rascal Flatts.
One other contestant also competed at Miss America: Michelle Ann Neves, who was Miss Massachusetts 2000.
Contestants who later competed in the Miss USA pageant were:
Allison Nesemeier (North Dakota) – Miss North Dakota USA 1998
Kelli Paarz (New Jersey) – Miss New Jersey USA 1998
Shauna Gambill (California) – Miss California USA 1998 (first runner-up at Miss USA 1998)
Kimberly Pressler (New York) – Miss New York USA and Miss USA 1999
Angie Carpenter (Mississippi) – Miss Mississippi USA 2000
Jennifer Lyn Hunt (Maine) – Miss Maine USA 2000
Paige Swenson (Minnesota) – Miss Minnesota USA 2000
Tiffany Meyer (Missouri) – Miss Kansas USA 2000 (finalist at Miss USA 2000)
Nicole Bigham (Pennsylvania) – Miss Pennsylvania USA 2002
Jodi Ann Paterson (Oregon) was Playboy's' Playmate of the Year 2000 and is the first contestant who not born in USA who competed in the pageant. Jodi was born in Indonesia. The others is Rachel Smith (Miss Teen Tennessee USA 2002), Paromita Mitra (Miss Mississippi Teen USA 2009), Thatiana Diaz (Miss New York Teen USA 2010), Kimberly Lane (Miss Idaho Teen USA 2012), Jacqueline Cai (Miss New Mexico Teen USA 2012) and Valentina Sanchez (Miss New Jersey Teen USA 2014).
Charlotte Martin (Illinois) went on to become a successful singer-songwriter.
Shauna Gambill (California) went on to win the Miss World USA 1998 title. She was chosen to represent the United States at Miss World 1998 where she placed in the Top 10.
Keri Lynn Pratt (New Hampshire) is a television and movie actress. She has appeared in the movies Drive Me Crazy and America's Sweethearts. She has guest starred on hit television shows 7th Heaven and Brothers & Sisters.
Emily Huff's (Hawaii) sister, Ashley, won the titles of Miss Nevada 2001 and Miss Nevada USA 2003.

External links
Official website

1994
1994 beauty pageants
1994 in the United States
1994 in Mississippi